The Auburn Tigers college football team competes as part of the National Collegiate Athletic Association (NCAA) Division I Football Bowl Subdivision, representing Auburn University in the Western Division of the Southeastern Conference (SEC). Auburn has played their home games at Jordan–Hare Stadium in Auburn, Alabama since 1939. The Tigers have won two national championships, completed 12 undefeated seasons, including seven perfect seasons, recorded 15 total conference championships, appeared in 41 post-season bowl games (winning 23), have finished first or tied for first in the SEC's Western Division nine times, and have represented the Western Division in the SEC Championship Game six times. The Associated Press (AP) ranks Auburn eleventh in all-time Final AP Poll appearances. With 733 wins, Auburn ranks 12th all-time in win–loss records in the NCAA Football Bowl Subdivision.

Seasons

Notes

References

Auburn

Auburn Tigers football seasons